A side friction roller coaster is an early roller coaster design that has two sets of wheels – normal road wheels and side-friction wheels to prevent the cars from derailing on sharp curves. In comparison, modern roller coasters have a third set of wheels, called up-stop wheels, that allow them to perform steep drops, whereas side-friction coasters almost never featured drops of steeper than 45 degrees.

History
The side-friction coaster was invented near the beginning of the 20th century. The most common design was, by far, the stacked figure-eight layout, with dozens appearing in parks throughout the world. This version often went by names such as "Toboggan Slide", "Drop/Dip/Leap the Dips", or simply "Figure Eight", and featured tiny drops.

Other side friction coasters, such as the giant coaster at Crystal Beach Park, were built in a style similar to modern wooden roller coasters, and featured large drops and extremely rapid turns.

The invention of up-stop wheels in the 1910s allowed much more scope for height, speed, and steepness in coaster designs, leaving side friction coasters to quickly fall out of favor. Only a handful have been built since World War II, and none since 1961. Today, there are only two side-friction coasters left in the world, and nine scenic railways standing, with 8 still operating. One of the most recently closed examples was the "Runaway Coaster" at the defunct Rotunda Amusement Park in Kent, England, which was closed in 2003 and demolished on April 5, 2007.

Installations
Leap the Dips at Lakemont Park in Altoona, Pennsylvania.  Opened in 1902, Leap the Dips is the oldest roller coaster in the world and the last remaining side-friction roller coaster in North America. It was out of service from 1985 to 1999.
Slope Shooter at the Higashiyama Zoo and Botanical Gardens, built in 1961. It has a long, winding layout, and has troughs made of steel and concrete.

References

 http://www.oocities.org/ultimatethrillparks/woodtrackwheels.htm 
 Slope Shooter - Higashiyama Zoo and Botanical Gardens (Chikusa, Nagoya, Aichi, Japan)
 Giant Coaster - Crystal Beach (Crystal Beach, Ontario, Canada)

External links 

 
Types of roller coaster